Kieran O'Brien (born 1973) is an English actor.

Early life and education
Born in Oldham, Lancashire, O'Brien grew up in nearby Royton, and was educated at the Bishop Henshaw Roman Catholic Memorial High School in Rochdale.

Career
O'Brien began acting at an early age and was the star of BBC TV series Gruey by the time he was 15. He also featured in several other series at the time in one-off or recurring roles.

In 1993, he played the role of Joe Egerton and then Craig Lee in Coronation Street and then the role of Lee Jones in Children's Ward. In 1993 he also became a regular in the detective series Cracker, as the titular character's son.

In 1999, O'Brien appeared in his first feature film, Virtual Sexuality. In 2001 he played the role of Private Allen Vest in HBO's acclaimed series Band of Brothers where he played a prominent part in the episode 'The Last Patrol'. He also appeared in the 2002 film 24 Hour Party People. In 2003 he appeared in the Cooper Temple Clause music video "Promises, Promises" and can be seen saying he got 'laid' in the Millennium Dome in the making of the video.

In 2004, O'Brien appeared in the controversial film 9 Songs. According to The Guardian, 9 Songs was the most sexually explicit mainstream film to date, largely because it includes several scenes of real sexual acts between the two lead actors. His role is highly unusual in that he had unsimulated and very graphic sex with his co-star Margo Stilley, including genital fondling, female masturbation with and without a vibrator, penetrative vaginal sex, cunnilingus, footjob and fellatio. During a scene in which Stilley stimulates his penis with her hand after performing fellatio on him, he became the only mainstream British actor who has been shown ejaculating in a mainstream UK-produced feature.

O'Brien strongly defended the film during the controversy that followed, saying that he saw no problem with having sex for a film. He said:
"People who say they find it offensive are liars. If they say they find it shocking, I don't believe them. It's only sex. To me they were just scenes we were shooting, to be honest, and I was surprised how ordinary and how natural it was. But it's a different thing for a girl than it is for a lad. I didn't fancy her—I felt protective towards her. On set she was the only woman with a crew of four lads. I know how difficult it was for her. You can't get away from the fact she's a young girl."

To date, O'Brien continues both his television and film acting careers. Recent appearances have been made in The Road to Guantánamo and Totally Frank as well as a reprise of his role in Cracker.

O'Brien was also one of the stars of the BBC's police drama HolbyBlue, appearing from the first episode until the third episode of the second series.

In 2013, O'Brien toured the UK in a stage production of Simon Beaufoy's 1997 comedy-drama film The Full Monty, in which he plays the "absurdly over-endowed" guy.

Personal life
O'Brien was in a relationship with Brookside actress Nicola Stephenson for eight years until 1999.

Filmography

Television

References

External links
 

1973 births
English male child actors
English male film actors
English male television actors
English people of Irish descent
Male actors from Oldham
Living people